Cilus gilberti, the corvina or corvina drum, is a saltwater fish of the family Sciaenidae (commonly called croakers or drums). It is the only species in the genus Cilus. It inhabits mostly tropical to temperate coastal waters of the southeastern Pacific along Central and South America. The corvina is highly prized in South America as a food fish.

The fish was given the species name gilberti by Charles Conrad Abbott, in honour of “friend and instructor” Charles Henry Gilbert (1859-1928).

Description
The corvina is similar in appearance to its relatives the weakfish and spotted seatrout. Its body is blue-grey on top, silvery overall with small scales, and is elongated and somewhat compressed in shape. It has a large mouth and a dorsal fin that is deeply notched between spiny and soft parts. It reaches  or more.

Range and habitat
The corvina is found along the South American Pacific coastline from Chile to Panama, and also in the Galapagos.

Culinary uses
The corvina has a white and flaky texture and a mild, sweet taste. Cooking methods include grilled, baked, fried, and sashimi. It is a popular choice in ceviche.

References

Sciaenidae
Western South American coastal fauna
Galápagos Islands coastal fauna
Fish described in 1899
Taxa named by Charles Conrad Abbott
Monotypic ray-finned fish genera